Giant Days is a comedic comic book written by John Allison, with art by Max Sarin and Lissa Treiman. The series follows three young women – Esther de Groot, Susan Ptolemy and Daisy Wooton – who share a hall of residence at university. Originally created as a webcomic spin-off from his previous series Scary Go Round, and then self-published as a series of small press comics, Giant Days was subsequently picked up by Boom! Studios first as a six-issue miniseries and then as a monthly ongoing series. In 2016 Giant Days was nominated for two Eisner Awards and four Harvey Awards. In 2019, it won two Eisner awards, for Best Continuing Series and Best Humor Publication.

Creation

Webcomic
Giant Days is part of the same universe as Allison's previous series Bobbins and Scary Go Round. When Scary Go Round came to end in 2009, Allison followed it with the series Bad Machinery. However, Bad Machinery – a mystery series about school-aged sleuths – was a departure from Scary Go Round, which had focused on a group of twenty-somethings, and Allison worried that the new series might alienate his audience. In case Bad Machinery failed, Allison began planning a second series based on the character of Esther de Groot from Scary Go Round. Although Bad Machinery ultimately proved to be a success, he produced three short Giant Days stories between chapters of Bad Machinery. These were subsequently printed and sold by Allison.

Ongoing series
In 2013, Boom! Studios launched "Boom! Box", an imprint for experimental comics from established artists outside the comics industry. Allison, who was friends with Boom! editor Shannon Watters after catching her when she fell at a convention, saw Boom! Box as a good fit for continuing the Giant Days story and pitched it. The series was initially picked up as a six-issue limited series with pencilling by Disney animator Lissa Treiman (who had previously written a guest comic for Scary Go Round). This was the first time Allison had written a comic but not drawn it. Giant Days was a success, and after the final issue of the miniseries was picked up as ongoing series, with Max Sarin replacing Treiman (although Treiman remained the cover artist until issue 24). Allison announced the end of the series at issue 55. Later this was clarified as ending at issue #54, with a special over-sized issue As Time Goes By wrapping up the series.

Setting
Giant Days is set at the University of Sheffield and has a more realistic, less paranormal atmosphere than Allison's other comics, which take place in the fictional town of Tackleford. The series begins with Scary Go Round character Esther de Groot, a melodramatic goth, moving into her hall of residence and befriending her new neighbours: the cheerful homeschooled Daisy Wooton and the prickly but grounded Susan Ptolemy. The three webcomic storylines focus on Esther, as she is targeted by a gang of private school head girls, breaks up with her school boyfriend, and joins a black metal society. In the comic book series, Susan initially was the viewpoint character although the series remains an ensemble.

Characters

Main

Esther de Groot 
Esther is tall, slim, pale, and goth. She is an English Literature student who loves black metal. She is proficient in boxing and is often seen falling in and out of love with various young men. Her friends consider her to be a drama queen, but she is also a very loyal and protective friend.

Susan Ptolemy 
Susan is shorter and more of a tomboy than the other girls. She grew up in Northampton, smokes a lot and adopts a tough attitude but is secretly very sensitive. Though she is a medical student, Susan also has a reputation for being very slovenly and her roommates are constantly trying to get her to clean her filthy room and laptop. At the beginning of the series, she is secretly in love with her childhood friend McGraw, whom she later dates. She is very caring for her friend.

Daisy Wooton 
Daisy is biracial, tall, with curly/frizzy orangish hair and glasses, studying Archaeology. She is an orphan whose parents died in a plane crash, after which she was raised and homeschooled by her grandmother. Daisy struggles with her sexuality and eventually dates a woman. Her friends see her as an innocent, wide-eyed optimist. She is very sweet and always tries to see the best in people.

Secondary

Graham McGraw 
A fellow student and childhood friend/enemy of Susan's from Northampton who eventually dates her. He is very serious, mature, and an excellent handyman who often helps the girls do odd jobs around their apartment when they move off-campus.

Ed Gemmell 
A fellow student who harbors an unrequited crush on Esther. He is also a friend and roommate of McGraw's.

Reception
Giant Days was well received, with reviewers especially positive about its depiction of women. Oliver Sava of The A.V. Club noted that "College-aged women are a demographic woefully underserved in the world of monthly comics, so when a new title caters to this group, it immediately stands out" and that "Women make up a large portion of Disney fandom, and hiring a Disney animator for Giant Days gives the book a visual sensibility that will appeal to those fans while presenting a story they don’t get to see in the Disney house style." Janelle Asselin writing for Comics Alliance praised its depiction of online shaming while Comic Bastards singled out the depth of the characters, in particular the sympathetic treatment of Daisy's homeschooling and the nuance of her coming-out arc. David Nieves, reviewing the first issue for Comics Beat, described Treiman's art as having the "emotional grandiose of Scott Pilgrim" and the writing as having "the feminine voice of HBO’s GIRLS", both with a newspaper comic strip influence, but noted that "a slice of life story needs a little more emotional stakes".

Awards
 2016 Eisner Awards: Nominated for Best Limited Series
 2016 Eisner Awards: Nominated for Best Writer/Artist (John Allison)
 2016 Harvey Awards: Nominated for Best New Series
 2016 Harvey Awards: Nominated for Most Promising New Talent (Lissa Treiman)
 2016 Harvey Awards: Nominated for Best Original Graphic Publication for Younger Readers
 2016 Harvey Awards: Nominated for Best Continuing or Limited Series
 2018 Eisner Awards: Nominated for Best Continuing Series
 2019 Eisner Awards: Best Continuing Series
 2019 Eisner Awards: Best Humor Publication
 2019 Eisner Awards: Nominated for Best Lettering

Issues

Collected editions
The series has so far been assembled into the following collections:

Trade paperbacks

Hardcovers

References

Boom! Studios titles
Comics about women
Comics set in the United Kingdom
School-themed comics
Slice of life comics
Humor comics
2010s webcomics
British webcomics
Webcomics in print
University of Sheffield
2015 comics debuts
British small press comics